The multipore searsid (Normichthys operosus) is a species of fish in the family Platytroctidae (tubeshoulders).

Name

Its scientific name is from the Latin operōsus, "busy, hardworking".

Its common name "multipore" refers to the dermal pits located behind its shoulders, and "searsid" is a name used for fish that resemble Searsia koefoedi.

Description

Its body is deep and compressed, its head about one-third of body length. It has a simple lateral line and few or no photophores. It has two to four large, and several smaller, open dermal pits behind the upper part of shoulder girdle, with usually at least one pit twice as wide as body scales; these give it the name "multipore."

Habitat

It is most concentrated in the waters southwest of Ireland.

References

Platytroctidae
Fish described in 1951
Taxa named by Albert Eide Parr